The 2020 Big Ten women's basketball tournament was a postseason tournament scheduled for March 4–8, 2020 at Bankers Life Fieldhouse in Indianapolis.

Seeds
All 14 Big Ten schools are participating in the tournament. Teams will be seeded by 2019–20 Big Ten Conference season record. The top 10 teams receive a first-round bye and the top 4 teams receive a double bye.

Seeding for the tournament will be determined at the close of the regular conference season:

Schedule

*Game times in Eastern Time. #Rankings denote tournament seeding.

Bracket
 All times are Eastern.

* denotes overtime period

See also

 2020 Big Ten Conference men's basketball tournament

References

Big Ten women's basketball tournament
Tournament
Big Ten women's basketball tournament
Big Ten women's basketball tournament
Big Ten
College basketball tournaments in Indiana
Women's sports in Indiana